The Haifa Street helicopter incident or the Haifa Street massacre was a controversial event in Baghdad, Iraq, on September 12, 2004. The fighting started before dawn on Haifa Street, where insurgents detonated two car bombs and attacked American troops with heavy gunfire. An American Bradley armored fighting vehicle was mobilized to support US troops, but it was struck by a car bomb around 6:30 a.m., wounding four American soldiers.

After the wounded Americans were evacuated, witnesses reported that a crowd had gathered around the burning Bradley, apparently celebrating. Media personnel also arrived on the scene, filming the burning wreckage. Reports said that the media and crowd had been gathered around the vehicle after the fighting ended. At around 8:00 a.m., an American helicopter fired two missiles and machine guns at the burning tank, killing 13 people and injuring about 60 others.

Among the dead was Mazen al-Tumeizi, a Palestinian reporter for al-Arabiya TV who was filming a report at the time. Tumeizi's death and the incident itself were caught by his cameraman.

The American military said it fired on the vehicle "to prevent looting and harm to the Iraqi people," and that they had fired on insurgents, not civilians.

References

External links
 At least 12 killed in Baghdad fighting
 Incident on Haifa Street
 Army Defends Baghdad Battle That Left 16 Dead
 Motive for Haifa Street Helicopter Massacre Remains a Mystery
 Eyewitness account

2004 in Iraq
Iraqi insurgency (2003–2011)
2000s in Baghdad
Filmed killings in Asia
Controversies in Iraq
September 2004 events in Iraq